Adamou Idé (born 22 November 1951) is a Nigerien poet and novelist.

Biography
A native speaker of the Zarma language, Idé left his home in Niamey, Niger, to study public administration in France, receiving degrees from The Sorbonne (Université de Paris I) and the Institut international d'administration publique in Paris, serving as an official in the Government of Niger and in international organizations. Idé published his first collection of poems, Cri Inachivé (The Unfinished Cry) in 1984, and his first novel in 1987.  He has published both in French and in Zarma.  Idé won the first Nigerien National Poetry Prize (Prix national de Poésie) in 1981 and the Grand Prix Littéraire Boubou Hama du Niger in 1996.  He has served as a jury member for the Grand prix littéraire d'Afrique noire in 1991 and received the Chevalier de l'Ordre du Mérite ("Knight of the Order of Merit") of Niger. He has served as the president of the "Societé des Gens du Lettres du Niger" and the 3rd African Forum of Documentary Film (Niamey, 2008.)

Works
Tous les blues ne donnent pas le cafard  (Not All Blues Make You Depressed),  Novel,  Editions La Cheminante, Ciboure, 2009  
Misères et grandeurs ordinaires  (Miseries and Glories of Regular People), Novel, Editions La Cheminante, Hendaye, 2008 
Chants de mer pour un fils malade,  (Sea Shanties for a Sick Child) Poems, Editions Nathan-Adamou, Niamey, 2006
Ay ne hân J'ai dit que...,  (So I Said...) Short fiction, (Edited collection, Zarma language), Editions Albasa, Niamey, 2004
Wa sappe ay se ! Votez pour moi !  (Vote For Me!) Short fiction, (Zarma language), Editions Albasa, Niamey, 2003  
Talibo, un enfant du quartier (Talibo, a Neighborhood Child), Novel, Editions L'Harmattan, Paris, 1996 
Sur les terres de silence (On the Lands of Silence), Poems, Editions L'Harmattan, Paris, 1994  
La Camisole de paille (The Straw Camisole), Novel, Imprimerie Nationale du Niger [INN], Niamey, 1987 
Cri inachevé (The Unfinished Cry, French/Zarma), Poems, Imprimerie Nationale du Niger [INN], Niamey, 1984

External links
English language translation of poem "J'ai peur" ("I'm Scared") at the festival de poesia de Medellin (2005).

References

Simon Gikandi. "Adamou Idé". Encyclopedia of African literature. Taylor & Francis, 2003  pp. 13–14.
 Amadou Ide, écrivain nigérien. Raliou Hamed-Assaleh, Radio France Internationale.  30 January 2010.
"Tous les blues ne donnent pas le cafard" le nouveau livre de Adamou Idé.  Fofo Magazine (Niamey).  8 September 2009.

1951 births
Living people
Nigerien poets
Nigerien novelists
École nationale d'administration alumni
University of Paris alumni
Zarma people
20th-century poets
21st-century poets
20th-century novelists
21st-century novelists